Episparis is a genus of moths in the family Erebidae erected by Francis Walker in 1857.

Description
Palpi upturned and hairy. Third joint minute. A short frontal tuft present. Antennae bipectinated to two-thirds length in male. Thorax and abdomen clothed with coarse hair. Tibia hairy. Forewings with straight costa. Outer margin excised from vein 5 to outer angle. Hindwings with produced outer margin to a point at vein 3 and excised below the point.

Species

 Episparis agnesae Pelletier, 1982
 Episparis angulatilinea Bethune-Baker, 1906
 Episparis brunoi Pelletier, 1982
 Episparis connubens Holland, 1894
 Episparis costistriga (Walker, 1864)
 Episparis emmanueli Pelletier, 1982
 Episparis experimens Walker, 1862
 Episparis farinosa Bryk, 1915
 Episparis fenestrifera Bryk, 1915
 Episparis gomphiona Hampson, 1926
 Episparis grandis Pelletier, 1982
 Episparis hannemanni Pelletier, 1982
 Episparis hieroglyphica Holland, 1894
 Episparis homoeosema Hampson, 1926
 Episparis hyalinata (Holland, 1920)
 Episparis jacquelina Swinhoe, 1902
 Episparis lamprina Holland, 1894
 Episparis leucotessellis Hampson, 1902
 Episparis liturata (Fabricius, 1787)
 Episparis lunata Holland, 1894
 Episparis malagasy Viette, 1966
 Episparis minima Pelletier, 1982
 Episparis monochroma Hampson, 1926
 Episparis okinawensis Sugi, 1982
 Episparis penetrata Walker, [1857]
 Episparis sinistra (Holland 1894)
 Episparis spilothyris Viette, 1956
 Episparis sponsata (Fabricius, 1787)
 Episparis sylvani Pelletier, 1982
 Episparis taiwana Wileman & West, 1929
 Episparis tortuosalis Moore, 1867
 Episparis varialis (Walker, 1858)
 Episparis vitrea (Saalmuller, 1891)
 Episparis xanthographa Hampson, 1926

References

 
 

Pangraptinae
Moth genera